Lynette (Lyn) Ford,  an American storyteller, teaching artist, author and creative narrative workshop presenter was the first storyteller in the state of Ohio to be nominated for a Governor's Award for the Arts.  She is a regular performer at regional and national storytelling festivals and conferences, including the National Storytelling Festival, Hawaii's Talk Story Festival and the Timpanogos Storytelling Festival. Lyn has also shared keynote presentations, performances and workshops in Australia and Ireland, and for the Transformative Language Arts Network's and Ohio Literacy Resource Center's annual conferences and events.    

Lyn is an Ohio teaching artist with the Ohio Alliance for Arts Education and the Ohio Teaching Artists rosters, and a Thurber House mentor for young authors. Lyn's first publications as an individual author are Affrilachian Tales and Beyond the Briar Patch. Both books are compilations of stories from Lyn's childhood memories, enriched with information on Affrilachian culture. 

Other book publications - Hot Wind, Boiling Rain:  Scary Stories for Strong Hearts. Lyn has also contributed to several storytelling newsletters and magazines.

Publications written or edited with fellow storyteller and teaching artist Sherry Norfolk: 

• Boo-Tickle Tales: Not So Scary Stories for Ages 4-9.

• Speak Peace: Words of Wisdom, Work, and Wonder.

• Supporting Diversity and Inclusion with Story: Authentic Folktales and Discussion Guides.

Lyn is a two-time recipient of the National Storytelling Network's ORACLE award, receiving both its Leadership and Service and Circle of Excellence awards. Lyn is a member of the National Association of Black Storytellers Circle of Elders.  “An exceptional artist.”  – Jim Arter, Greater Columbus Arts Council.

See also
Storytelling
Storytelling festival

References

External links
Lyn Ford's Homepage
Biography at Greater Columbus (Ohio) Arts Council
Breaking into Storytelling Interview with Lyn on The Art of Storytelling with Brother Wolf.  One hour of audio content.]

African-American history in Appalachia
American storytellers
Women storytellers
Living people
Year of birth missing (living people)